The ASRC/ConocoPhillips Great Alaska Shootout is an annual women's college basketball tournament in Anchorage, Alaska that features host University of Alaska Anchorage and three visiting NCAA Div. I teams. The four-team tournament resumed in 2022 following a four-year layoff. The women's Shootout was started in 1980 and ran through 1997 as the Northern Lights Invitational, featuring either four- or eight-team fields and playing at the UAA Sports Center. Following a one-year absence, the tournament was renamed and run along with the men's Great Alaska Shootout every Thanksgiving week from 1999 to 2017. The tournament was held at Sullivan Arena from 1999 to 2013 and moved to the Alaska Airlines Center in 2014.

Now co-sponsored by Arctic Slope Regional Corporation and ConocoPhillips Alaska, the 2022 tournament is being held Nov. 18–19 at the Alaska Airlines Center. The 2022 field features host Alaska Anchorage (an NCAA Div. II program) against NCAA Div. I programs UC Riverside, La Salle and Pepperdine.

Men's Shootout History
The University of Alaska Anchorage (UAA) hosted the tournament every Thanksgiving from 1978 to 2017. Tournament games were played at the Alaska Airlines Center, a new arena on the UAA campus, from 2014 to 2017. Prior to that, games were played at the Sullivan Arena in Anchorage from 1983 to 2013 and at Buckner Field House on Fort Richardson from 1978 to 1982. The men's tournament included eight teams (with the exception of a six-team field in 2009).

The tournament was one of the longest-running tournaments in college basketball history, lasting for 40 years, and brought the highest level of basketball to Alaska. The Shootout was held Thanksgiving weekend.

Under National Collegiate Athletic Association (NCAA) rules, teams are normally limited to approximately 28 regular-season games. However, games in "exempted events," traditionally played early in the season, are not counted against that limit. The most recent policy from the NCAA in this regard allows all teams to play in one exempted event per season. Those teams who choose to take advantage of that opportunity may play up to thirty-one games per season, including games played in those exempted events but excluding postseason tournament games. A previous version of the rule allowed for all games played outside the United States mainland to be exempt from the then-27-game limit. This version was partly responsible for the genesis of tournaments such as Great Alaska Shootout.

The Great Alaska Shootout began in 1978 as the brainchild of former UAA men's basketball coach Bob Rachal. Raycom Sports first picked up the broadcast rights to the tournament in 1979., and ESPN began broadcasting it in 1985.

On August 26, 2017, it was announced that the 2017 Shootout would be the last. The University of Alaska Anchorage stopped funding it as newer tournaments were drawing away top teams to warmer locations.

Past champions, runners-up and MVPs

Men's tournament
The following table indicates the winners, runners-up and tournament most valuable players (MVPs).

Women's tournament
The following table indicates the winners, runners up and tournament MVPs.

1Tournament was played in a round robin format.
2The tournament was moved to earlier in the season beginning in the 1994–95 season; hence the first 1994 tournament corresponds to the 1993–94 season and the second tournament to the 1994–95 season.

References

External links
 Great Alaska Shootout home page

 
1978 establishments in Alaska
2017 disestablishments in Alaska
Alaska Anchorage Seawolves basketball
Basketball in Alaska
Sports in Anchorage, Alaska
Sports competitions in Alaska
College basketball competitions
College men's basketball competitions in the United States
College women's basketball competitions in the United States
Recurring sporting events established in 1978
Recurring sporting events disestablished in 2017